John Alan Wilson (born 1948), is a male former athlete who competed for England.

Athletics career
He represented England and won a silver medal in the 4 x 400 metres relay with Alan Pascoe, Andy Carter and Bill Hartley, at the 1974 British Commonwealth Games in Christchurch, New Zealand. He also competed at the European Athletics Championships 1971 in Helsinki.

References

1948 births
English male sprinters
Commonwealth Games medallists in athletics
Commonwealth Games silver medallists for England
Athletes (track and field) at the 1974 British Commonwealth Games
Living people
Medallists at the 1974 British Commonwealth Games